is a Japanese musician who has worked with several visual kei bands, including La:Sadie's, Syndrome, Kisaki Project  and Phantasmagoria. Besides playing bass and keyboards and composing music, he also works as a producer, previously for the Matina label and currently for Under Code Production. In 2008, when Phantasmagoria broke up, Kisaki once announced his retirement as a musician (although he would continue to participate in side projects, compose for other musicians, and produce the artists on his record label). However, in 2010, he announced that he was ending his retirement and debuted his new band, .

Record Labels

Matina
Matina was an independent label that managed visual kei artists. It was formed in 1997 by Kisaki as Matina Soleil, the Osaka branch of larger visual kei label Soleil. When Soleil closed, Matina became an independent entity and eventually formed its own sub-labels (Eternal, its Kantō region branch, and Storm, its Hokkaido branch). Matina featured a large number of bands, most of whom had few releases and were short lived. After its fifth anniversary, Matina closed in 2002.

Under Code Production
Under Code Production is Kisaki's second indie visual kei label, and is a sub-label of Free-Will.  It was formed in 2003 in the Kansai region, slightly after Matina's demise. Although its focus is visual bands, Under Code Production has produced several non-visual artists, including Anti-Kranke, Cious pi Cious, and Oto-oni (音鬼). The label also has established sub-labels: Road Awake, a sublabel for hardcore bands Harvest and Vagerke, and Haunted House Records, a sub-label created exclusively for the band Flesh for Flankenstein. Although Under Code Production has a public reputation as a label with many similar artists, it is one of the biggest indie visual kei labels today.

In 2013, UNDER CODE officially closed its doors. As a result, many bands signed to the label split up, such as Nega, Megaromania, DALI, Vior Gloire. A handful of other acts remained active, such as FUTURISM・BOYZ, 凛 (LIN), and REALies. Several musicians related to UNDER CODE formed their own labels, such as GOEMAN Records formed by REALies' frontman Rayka, and King Zebra formed by 朱's (SUZAKU) vocalist 樹 (Itsuki).

Career History
Kisaki began his career as a roadie for SCARE CROW in 1992. In 1993, he joined his first band, Levia. From that point, he began a career of over 15 years in various bands: Sheyde (SHËY≠DË), Garden, Stella Maria, La:Sadie's (which later reformed as Dir En Grey), Mirage, Syndrome, and Phantasmagoria. When Phantasmagoria formed, it was announced as Kisaki's final band. Thus, when the group broke up in 2008, Kisaki retired from performing to concentrate on managing Under Code Production and producing. Despite this, on February 1, 2010, Kisaki announced that he was planning to end his retirement and form a new band. In the summer of 2010, the new band was revealed to be .

Kisaki Project

Kisaki Project (also written as Kisaki Solo Project) was Kisaki's solo project. The band's lineup changed often, with the only permanent member being Kisaki. Most of the time  (of Vidoll) was the featured vocalist. Kisaki composed and wrote the lyrics for all of the band's songs, which consisted primarily of soft rock and pop ballads.

Brief history
The band participated in an omnibus in 2002, but did not officially form until the next year. In 2004, the band traveled to Europe and released an album there. It paused activities on October 31 as Phantasmagoria was forming.  In 2006, Kisaki Project resumed activities, performing live and releasing music once again. In 2007, Kisaki Project officially disbanded at the same time as Phantasmagoria "sealed" activities.

The Kisaki project then returned briefly in 2011, featuring 砂月 (Satsuki) (of RENTRER EN SOI) as the vocalist. This lineup released two demo CDs, a single that came with a DVD, and a mini-album containing all of this era's material. The band then ceased activities in 2012, shortly before UNDER CODE PRODUCTION went out of business.

Discography

Albums

Singles

Videos

Kisaki & Kansai Kizoku

 was a side project by Kisaki and Rame (from Vidoll).

Discography

Albums

Singles

Videos

References

External links
 KISAKI Official Website

Japanese rock bass guitarists
Visual kei musicians
Japanese record producers
1976 births
Living people
Musicians from Wakayama Prefecture
21st-century bass guitarists